Satyrium californica, the California hairstreak,  is a butterfly of the family Lycaenidae. It is found from British Columbia south to southern California and east to Colorado.

The wingspan is 25–32 mm. The upperside is brown with an orange spot on the hindwings. The outer edge of the forewings usually has row of orange spots. The underside is brown-grey with orange crescents and a postmedian band of black spots. Each hindwing has two tails. Adults feed on the nectar of various flowers, including Eriogonum and Asclepias species.

In Canada, the larvae feed on Cercocarpus, Salix species, buckbrush (Ceanothus spp.), antelope-brush (Purshia tridentata), oaks (Quercus spp.), cherry (Prunus spp.), and saskatoon (Amelanchier alnifolia). In California, they are noted to feed on oaks, Apocynum cannabinum, Marrubium species, Ceanothus velutinus, California buckeye, milkweed, and other plants.

Adults are active April to September, depending on region. They overwinter as eggs.

Subspecies
Listed alphabetically.
S. c. brashor Kondla & Scott, 2006
S. c. californica
S. c. cygnus (Edwards, 1871)
S. c. obscurafacies (Austin, 1998)
S. c. wapiti Fisher, 2006

References

Butterflies described in 1862
Satyrium (butterfly)